London's Burning may refer to:

In music:
 "London's Burning" (round), a nursery rhyme derived from the Great Fire of London
 "London's Burning" (The Clash song), a song by the Clash

Other:
 London's Burning (film), a 2011 British television film
 London's Burning (TV series), a television series about fire fighters in London
 London's Burning (audio drama), based on the American television series Dark Shadows
 London's Burning (game), a World War II-based board game

See also
 Great Fire of London, the historical 1666 fire